Admiral Richard Stanislaus Edwards (18 February 1885 – 2 June 1956) served in the United States Navy during World War I and World War II.

Biography
Born in Philadelphia, Pennsylvania, Edwards was appointed to the United States Naval Academy in 1903. He was commissioned ensign on 13 September 1908 and through subsequent advancement attained the rank of admiral, to date from 13 April 1945.

His commands included the destroyer ; Submarine Squadron 6; Submarine Base, New London, Connecticut; the battleship ; Submarines, Patrol Force; and Submarines, Atlantic Fleet.

During World War II he served as Deputy Chief of Staff and Aide to the Commander in Chief, United States Fleet and then Deputy Commander in Chief, U.S. Fleet, and Deputy Chief of Naval Operations, all under Ernest J. King, Chief of Naval Operations and Commander in Chief, United States Fleet. For his World War II service, Edwards was awarded the Distinguished Service Medal. He subsequently served as Vice Chief of Naval Operations, Commander, Western Sea Frontier, and Commander, Pacific Reserve Fleet. He was transferred to the Navy's retired list on 1 July 1947, concluding a total of 43 years of naval service.

He died at the Naval Hospital, Oakland, California, 2 June 1956.

Decorations
Here is the ribbon bar of Admiral Richard S. Edwards:

Namesake
The   was named for him.

See also

References
 

1885 births
1956 deaths
Military personnel from Philadelphia
United States Naval Academy alumni
Vice Chiefs of Naval Operations
United States Navy admirals
United States submarine commanders
United States Navy personnel of World War I
United States Navy World War II admirals
Recipients of the Navy Cross (United States)
Recipients of the Navy Distinguished Service Medal
Recipients of the Legion of Honour
Recipients of the Croix de Guerre 1939–1945 (France)